The Washburn University Carnegie Library Building in Topeka, Kansas, United States, is a Carnegie library built in 1904. It was listed on the National Register of Historic Places in 1987.

Washburn College, later Washburn University of Topeka, established in 1865, obtained a $40,000.00 Carnegie Library grant for its construction in 1904.

References

Library buildings completed in 1904
Buildings and structures in Topeka, Kansas
Carnegie libraries in Kansas
Neoclassical architecture in Kansas
Libraries on the National Register of Historic Places in Kansas
National Register of Historic Places in Topeka, Kansas